This is a guide to the size of settlements in Anglesey based on the data from the article on each town. The entire population of Anglesey is 69,700 (2011 census).

References

 
Anglesey, towns
Anglesey population